The 2003 Mongolian National Championship was the thirty-sixth recorded edition of top flight football in Mongolia and the eighth season of the Mongolian Premier League, which took over as the highest level of competition in the country from the previous Mongolian National Championship. Khangarid from Erdenet, their second title, Mon-Uran were  runners up, with Erchim in third place.

Format
The competition was played in two stages: firstly a triple round robin league competition where each team played the others three time. Following this, four of the five competing teams qualified for the semifinal playoffs, the winners of which advanced to a one off final, with the losers contesting a third place match.

Results

League table

Results table

Matches 1-20

Matches 21-30

Playoffs

Bracket

Semi-finals

Third-place

Final

Topscorers

References

Mongolia Premier League seasons
Mongolia
Mongolia
football